William Humphrey Bennett, KC (December 23, 1859 – March 15, 1925) was a Canadian politician.

Biography
Born in Barrie, Canada West, the son of Humphrey Bennett and Anne A. Fraser, Bennett was educated at the Barrie Public and High Schools. After studying law he was called to the Bar of Ontario in 1881. Settling in Midland, Ontario, he was elected Reeve of Midland in 1886. He was a candidate for the House of Commons of Canada in the riding of Simcoe East in the 1891 federal election. He was defeated but after the election was declared void in 1891, he was acclaimed in the 1892 by-election. A Conservative, he was re-elected in 1896, 1900, and 1904. He was defeated in 1908. He was re-elected in the 1911 election. In 1917, he was summoned to the Senate of Canada on the advice of Robert Laird Borden representing the senatorial division of Simcoe East, Ontario. He served until his death in 1925. He was an early mentor of George Dudley, who served as an articled clerk under Bennett.

References

External links
 

1859 births
1925 deaths
Canadian senators from Ontario
Conservative Party of Canada (1867–1942) MPs
Conservative Party of Canada (1867–1942) senators
Members of the House of Commons of Canada from Ontario
Lawyers in Ontario
Canadian King's Counsel